The following is an alphabetical list of articles, categories, and lists related to the U.S. state of North Carolina'''.

0–9 
.nc.us – Internet second-level domain for the state of North Carolina
12th state to ratify the Constitution of the United States of America

A

Adjacent states:
Age of jevenille jurisdiction, North Carolina
Agriculture in North Carolina
American Revolutionary War, 1775–1783
American Revolution, History of North Carolina 
Amusement parks in North Carolina
Animal Protection Act, North Carolina
Appalachia
Aquaria in North Carolina, Category (commons:Category:Aquaria in North Carolina)
Arboreta in North Carolina, Category (commons:Category:Arboreta in North Carolina)
Archaeology of North Carolina (:Category:Archaeological sites in North Carolina(commons:Category:Archaeological sites in North Carolina)
Architecture of North Carolina
Art museums and galleries in North Carolina, category (commons:Category:Art museums and galleries in North Carolina)
Asheville, North Carolina
Astronomical observatories in North Carolina, Category (commons:Category:Astronomical observatories in North Carolina)
Attorney General of North Carolina
Auditor of North Carolina
Award, North Carolina

B

Barbecue in North Carolina
Beaches of North Carolina (commons:Category:Beaches of North Carolina)
Black Film Festival, North Carolina
Botanical gardens in North Carolina (commons:Category:Botanical gardens in North Carolina)
Buildings and structures in North Carolina (commons:Category:Buildings and structures in North Carolina)
Biltmore Estate
Blowing Rock, North Carolina
Boys Choir, North Carolina

C

Cabinet of North Carolina
Capitol of the State of North Carolina (commons:Category:North Carolina State Capitol)
Capital Area Metropolitan Planning Organization, North Carolina
Caves of North Carolina (commons:Category:Caves of North Carolina)
Census statistical areas, North Carolina
Census Designated Places in North Carolina, category
Center for the Advancement of Teaching Education, North Carolina
Cessions, Western territorial claims (1784)
Charlotte, North Carolina
Cherokee–American wars (1776–1794)
Cities in North Carolina, category
Civil War, North Carolina, 1861–1865
Climate of North Carolina (:Category:Climate of North Carolina, commons:Category:Climate of North Carolina)
Communications in North Carolina, category (commons:Category:Communications in North Carolina)
Commission on Interracial Cooperation, North Carolina
Commissioner of Agriculture
Commissioner of Insurance
Commissioner of Labor
Companies in North Carolina, category
Confederate States of America
United States congressional delegations from North Carolina
Congressional districts
Constitution of North Carolina
Convention centers in North Carolina, category (commons:Category:Convention centers in North Carolina)
Council of State of North Carolina
Courts of North Carolina
Culture of North Carolina, category (commons:Category:North Carolina culture)

D

Demographics of North Carolina
Department of Revenue, North Carolina
Department of Commerce, North Carolina
Department of Environmental Quality, North Carolina
Department of Military and Veterans Affairs, North Carolina
Department of Natural and Cultural Resources, North Carolina
Department of Public Safety, North Carolina
Department of Revenue, North Carolina
Department of Transfortation, North Carolina
Duke Chapel
Durham, North Carolina

E

Economy of North Carolina (:Category:Economy of North Carolina, commons:Category:Economy of North Carolina)
Education in North Carolina (:Category:Education in North Carolina, commons:Category:Education in North Carolina)
Education Lottery, North Carolina
Elections in the State of North Carolina, category (commons:Category:North Carolina elections)
Environment of North Carolina, category (commons:Category:Environment of North Carolina)

F

Fayetteville Convention Constitutional Convention of 1789
Ferry System, North Carolina
Festivals in North Carolina, category (commons:Category:Festivals in North Carolina)
Flag of the State of North Carolina
la Florida (Spanish colony, 1565–1763
Fort Bragg, North Carolina
Franklin, State of
French and Indian War (1754–1763)

G

Gambling in North Carolina
General Assembly (Legislative branch) of North Carolina
Geography of North Carolina (:Category:Geography of North Carolina, commons:Category:Geography of North Carolina)
Geology of North Carolina, category (commons:Category:Geology of North Carolina)
:Category:Ghost towns in North Carolina (commons:Category:Ghost towns in North Carolina)
Golf clubs and courses in North Carolina, category
Government of North Carolina (:Category:Government of North Carolina, commons:Category:Government of North Carolina)
Governor of the State of North Carolina
Great Seal of the State of North Carolina
Great Smoky Mountains National Park
Greensboro, North Carolina

H

Health in North Carolina, category
Heritage railroads in North Carolina, category (commons:Category:Heritage railroads in North Carolina)
North Carolina State Highway Patrol
Highway system, North Carolina
Hiking trails in North Carolina (commons:Category:Hiking trails in North Carolina)
Hillsborough Convention Constitution Convention of 1788
History of North Carolina (:Category:History of North Carolina, commons:Category:History of North Carolina)
History of slavery in North Carolina
Hot springs of North Carolina, category (commons:Category:Hot springs of North Carolina)
Home Economics Association, North Carolina
House Bill 11, North Carolina
House of Commons/Representatives of North Carolina
Hurricane recovery in North Carolina

I
Images of North Carolina, category (commons:Category:North Carolina)
Indian Reserve (1763), British
Indigenous peoples of North Carolina

J
Joara people (1567–1568)

K

Kirk-Holden war
Ku Klux Klan

L

Lakes of North Carolina, category (commons:Category:Lakes of North Carolina)
Landmarks in North Carolina, category (commons:Category:Landmarks in North Carolina)
Lexington Barbecue Festival
Lieutenant Governor of the State of North Carolina
Louisiana (New France), French colony of 1699–1763
Lowry War

Lists

Lists related to the State of North Carolina, category
List of airports in North Carolina
List of North Carolina area codes
List of cities, towns, and villages in North Carolina (commons:Category:Cities in North Carolina)
List of colleges and universities in North Carolina (commons:Category:Universities and colleges in North Carolina)
List of counties in North Carolina
List of North Carolina county seats )commons:Category:Counties in North Carolina)
List of dams and reservoirs in North Carolina
List of famous North Carolinians
List of festivals in North Carolina
List of forts in North Carolina (:Category:Forts in North Carolina, commons:Category:Forts in North Carolina)
List of ghost towns in North Carolina
List of governors of North Carolina
List of high schools in North Carolina
List of hospitals in North Carolina
List of individuals executed in North Carolina
List of islands of North Carolina
List of lakes in North Carolina
List of law enforcement agencies in North Carolina
List of metropolitan areas of North Carolina
List of museums in North Carolina (:Category:Museums in North Carolina)(commons:Category:Museums in North Carolina)
List of National Historic Landmarks in North Carolina
List of National Park Service areas in North Carolina
List of newspapers in North Carolina
List of North Carolina hurricanes
List of North Carolina militia units in the American Revolution
List of North Carolina state legislatures
List of plantations in North Carolina
List of people from North Carolina (category, commons:Category:People from North Carolina)
List of power stations in North Carolina
List of radio stations in North Carolina
List of North Carolina railroads
List of Registered Historic Places in North Carolina
List of rivers of North Carolina
List of North Carolina Scenic Byways
List of school districts in North Carolina
List of U.S. state abbreviations
List of state forests in North Carolina
List of North Carolina state legislatures
List of state parks in North Carolina
List of state prisons in North Carolina
List of symbols of the State of North Carolina
List of North Carolina state symbols (:Category:Symbols of North Carolina (commons:Category:Symbols of North Carolina)
List of Superfund sites in North Carolina
List of telephone area codes in North Carolina
List of television stations in North Carolina
List of unincorporated communities in North Carolina (Unincorporated communities in North Carolina, category
List of United States representatives from North Carolina
List of United States senators from North Carolina

M

Maps of North Carolina, category (commons:Category:Maps of North Carolina)
Mass media in North Carolina
Monuments and memorials in North Carolina, category (commons:Category:Monuments and memorials in North Carolina)
Mississippian culture of North Carolina
:Category:Municipalities in North Carolina
North Carolina Museum of Art
Music of North Carolina (commons:Category:Music of North Carolina, :Category:Musical groups from North Carolina
:Category:Musicians from North Carolina

N
National Forests of North Carolina, category (commons:Category:National Forests of North Carolina)
Natural gas pipelines in North Carolina, category
Natural history of North Carolina, category (commons:Category:Natural history of North Carolina)
New Bern, North Carolina, early capital (1712–1794)
North Carolina (:Category:North Carolina, commons:Category:North Carolina

O

Order of the Long Leaf Pine
Outdoor sculptures in North Carolina, category (commons:Category:Outdoor sculptures in North Carolina)

P

Parks and Recreation Trust Fund, North Carolina
People by city in North Carolina, category
Peopole by county in North Carolina, category
People from North Carolina by occupation, category
Piedmont Land Conservancy
Pigs in the City
Politics of North Carolina
Protected areas of North Carolina, category (commons:Category:Protected areas of North Carolina)
Province of Carolina (English, 1663–1707)
Province of Carolina (British, 1707–1712)
Province of North Carolina (British, 1712–1776)
North Carolina Provincial Congress
Public Radio Association, North Carolina
Pulled pork

Q
Quaker Gap Township, Stokes County, North Carolina

R
Railroad museums in North Carolina (commons:Category:Railroad museums in North Carolina)
Raleigh, North Carolina, state capital since 1794
Reconstruction, North Carolina (1865–1868)
Religion in North Carolina (:Category:Religion in North Carolina, commons:Category:Religion in North Carolina)
Rivers of North Carolina (commons:Category:Rivers of North Carolina)
Roanoke Colony (English colony)
Royal Proclamation of 1763
Rowan Resolves 1774

S

Safety and Emission Vehicle Inspection, North Carolina
Scouting in North Carolina
Secretary of State of North Carolina
Senate of the State of North Carolina
School Violence Prevention Act, North Carolina
Senate of North Carolina
Solar power in North Carolina
Sports in North Carolina (:Category:Sports in North Carolina, commons:Category:Sports in North Carolina)
:Category:Sports venues in North Carolina (commons:Category:Sports venues in North Carolina)
State Capitol, North Carolina
State House, North Carolina
State legislative building, North Carolina
Statesville, North Carolina 
Structured Sentencing Act, North Carolina
Sullivan Acts, North Carolina
Superintendent of Public Instruction of North Carolina
Supreme Court of North Carolina

T

Telecommunications in North Carolina, category (commons:Category:Communications in North Carolina)
Television shows set in North Carolina. category
Tennessee Valley Authority
Theatres in North Carolina, category (commons:Category:Theatres in North Carolina)
Tourism in North Carolina, category  (commons:Category:Tourism in North Carolina)
Towns in North Carolina, category
Townships in North Carolina, category
Trailblazers, North Carolina
Trail of Tears (1830–1838)
Transportation in North Carolina (:Category:Transportation in North Carolina, commons:Category:Transport in North Carolina)
Treasurer of North Carolina
Treaty of Fontainebleau of 1762
Treaty of Paris (1763)
Treaty of Paris (1783)

U
United States
United States Court of Appeals for the Fourth Circuit
United States Declaration of Independence of 1776
United States District Court for the Eastern District of North Carolina
United States District Court for the Middle District of North Carolina
United States District Court for the Western District of North Carolina
United States congressional delegations from North Carolina
North Carolina's congressional districts
Urban League of Central Carolinas
US-NC – ISO 3166-2:US region code for the State of North Carolina

V
Villages in North Carolina, category

W

War of 1812 (1812–1815)
Water parks in North Carolina, category
Waterfalls of North Carolina (:Category:Waterfalls of North Carolina, commons:Category:Waterfalls of North Carolina)
Wikimedia
Wikimedia Commons:Category:North Carolina
commons:Category:Maps of North Carolina
Wikinews:Category:North Carolina
Wikinews:Portal:North Carolina
Wikipedia:WikiProject North Carolina
:Category:WikiProject North Carolina articles
:Category:WikiProject North Carolina participants
Wildlife of North Carolina
Wilmington, North Carolina
Wind power in North Carolina
Wine Festival, North Carolina
Winston-Salem, North Carolina
Women's Right to Know Act, North Carolina

X

Y
Yancey County, North Carolina

Z
Zoos in North Carolina (commons:Category:Zoos in North Carolina)

See also

Topic overview:
North Carolina
Outline of North Carolina

North Carolina
 
North Carolina